The Tooele Chemical Agent Disposal Facility (TOCDF, also called Tooele Chemical Demilitarization Facility) or TOCDF, is a U.S. Army facility located at Deseret Chemical Depot in Tooele County, Utah that was used for dismantling chemical weapons.

Disposal
Destruction is a requirement under the Chemical Weapons Convention and is monitored by the Organisation for the Prohibition of Chemical Weapons. Deseret Chemical Depot held 44% of the nation's chemical stockpile when processing began, and it had held some of these chemical munitions since 1942. TOCDF was constructed in the early 1990s and began destruction of chemical agent-filled munitions on 22 August 1996. As of September 2011, the facility had processed 99% of its stockpile. TOCDF processed all of its VX, sarin and mustard gas at its main facility; a smaller incinerator was installed west of the main plant in order to dispose of lewisite-filled containers. In advance of plant closing, two ponds were revitalized and the surrounded area reseeded as well as 29 miles of railroad being removed (out of 40-miles of rail in Deseret). Disposal of all chemical weapons concluded on 21 January 2012. It was the last depot to complete its disposal operations under the U.S. Army Chemical Materials Agency; although two other depots still store chemical weapons to be destroyed by the Assembled Chemical Weapons Alternatives program at Pueblo, Colorado and Bluegrass, Kentucky.

GB campaign
Each of the weapons listed contained sarin (GB)
28,945  – 115mm self-propelled rockets (M55) containing 
1,056   – M56 warheads, which are M55 rockets without the rocket motor
119,400 – 105mm cartridges (M360)
679,303 – 105mm projectiles (M360)
67,685  – 155mm projectiles (M121/A1)
21,456  – 155mm projectiles (M122)
888     – Weteye bombs
4,463   –  bombs (MC-1)
5,709   – Ton containers containing
All sarin was disposed of by March 2002.

VX campaign
After completion of the GB campaigns, the plant was converted to dispose of similar weapons containing VX agent:
3,966  – M55 rockets
3,560  – M56 rocket warheads
53,216 – M121/A1 155mm projectiles
22,690 – M23 land mine
862    – TMU-28 Spray Tanks
640    – Ton Containers
All VX was disposed of by 3 June 2005. Processing of VX-contaminated containers was completed in October 2005.

Mustard Agent campaign
After VX processing was completed, the plant was reconfigured to process chemical weapons containing mustard gas, also called mustard agent or H or HD or HT.
5,463  - Ton Containers
54,453 - 155mm projectiles
63,274 - 4.2-inch (107 mm) mortars
Operations to destroy mustard gas weapons were completed on 21 January 2012.

Weapons disposal process
The destruction process involves receiving the items in protective containers from a covered, protected storage area, and placing the items onto trays for insertion into the automated processing area.

Inside the first automated area, the Explosion Containment Room, explosive components are removed from the items and destroyed in a rotating kiln called the Deactivation Furnace System. The items then are carried on automated cars to another room, called the Munition Processing Bay, where automated machinery sucks the liquid agent out. The liquid is sent to holding tanks. The nearly-empty items are then moved to the lower level on an automated lift, and introduced into a high-temperature (maximum 2,000 °F or 1,100 °C) oven called the Metal Parts Furnace, which destroys the residual agent so that the containers can be safely disposed of as scrap metal.

The liquid agent is destroyed in one of two high-temperature (maximum 2,700 °F or 1,500 °C) ovens called Liquid Incinerators. The products of combustion from the ovens and kilns pass through extensive Pollution Abatement Systems, which catch the airborne products as salts, and hold them in a liquid slurry called brine, which is periodically shipped to out-of-state underground disposal facilities.

See also
Deseret Test Center
United States and weapons of mass destruction
Tooele Army Depot

References 

Chemical Materials Agency: Utah

Further reading

External links
Official site

Chemical weapons destruction facilities
Buildings and structures in Tooele County, Utah
United States chemical weapons depots
1996 establishments in Utah